The 2006 Italian Formula Three Championship was the 42nd Italian Formula Three Championship season. It began on 9 April at Adria and ended on 22 October at Misano after 16 races.

Mauro Massironi of Passoli Racing dominated the season with a win at Magione and another eight successive wins at Vallelunga, Mugello, Varano and Pergusa and ultimately clinched the title. He finished 28 points clear of Corbetta Competizioni driver Davide Rigon, who won the opening race at Adria, a race at Magione and both of the season-ending races at Misano. Third place went to Lucidi Motors driver Alex Frassineti, who took one victory, and he finished ahead of Imola winner Michele Rugolo, who competed with Team Ghinzani.

Teams and drivers
All teams were Italian-registered and all cars competed on Michelin tyres.
{|
|

Calendar
All rounds were held in Italy.

Standings

Campionato Nazionale
Points are awarded as follows:

References

External links
 Official website

Italian Formula Three Championship seasons
Formula Three
Italian
Italian Formula 3 Championship